is a live album by Japanese singer/songwriter Mari Hamada. Recorded live at the Nakano Sun Plaza and Osaka Kōsei Nenkin Kaikan, the album was released on July 2, 1985, by Invitation. The album was last reissued on October 22, 2008.

Track listing

Video album 

The video album for Magical Mystery "Mari" was released on VHS and LaserDisc formats on June 21, 1985. It was reissued on DVD by Victor Entertainment under the Speedstar label on January 21, 2005.

Track listing

References

External links 
  (Mari Hamada)
  (Victor Entertainment)
 
 

1985 live albums
1985 video albums
Japanese-language live albums
Mari Hamada albums
Victor Entertainment live albums
Albums recorded at Nakano Sun Plaza